This is a list of compositions by Emilie Mayer.

Piano

Piano solo 
 Salonstücke, Op. 29/2
 Salonstücke, Op. 30
 Salonstücke, Op. 31
 Salonstücke, Op. 32
 Salonstücke, Op. 33
 Drei Humoresken, Op. 41
 Impromptu, Op. 44
 La modesta, Op. 45
 Für die Kinderwelt, Op. 48
 9 Tänze
 March in A-flat Major
 Piano Sonata in D Minor
 Piano Sonata

Chamber music

Violin and piano 
 Violin Sonata in F Major, Op. 17
 Violin Sonata in A Minor, Op. 18
 Violin Sonata in E Minor, Op. 19
 Violin Sonata in D Minor, Op. 29
 Notturno for Violin and Piano, Op. 48/2
 Violin Sonata in D Minor
 Violin Sonata in D Major
 Violin Sonate in E-flat Major

Cello and piano 
 Cello Sonata in D Minor, Op. 38
 Cello Sonate in C Major, Op. 40
 Cello Sonata in D Major, Op. 47
 Cello Sonata in F Major
 Cello Sonata in C Major
 Cello Sonata in C Minor
 Cello Sonata in D Minor
 Cello Sonata in E Minor
 Cello Sonata in A Major
 Cello Sonata in B Major
 Cello Sonata in B Major
 Cello Sonata in B Minor

Piano trios 
 Piano Trio in E Minor, Op. 12
 Piano Trio in D Major, Op. 13
 Piano Trio in E♭ Major
 Piano Trio in D Minor
 Piano Trio in E Minor
 Piano Trio in A Minor
 Piano Trio in B Minor, Op. 16
 Piano Trio in B♭ Major

Piano quartets 
 Piano Quartet in E-flat Major
 Piano Quartet in G Major

String quartets 
 String Quartet in G Minor, Op. 14
 String Quartet in F Major
 String Quartet in D Minor
 String Quartet in E Minor
 String Quartet in G Major
 String Quartet in B Major
 String Quartet in A Major

String quintets 
 String Quintet in D Major
 String Quintet in D Minor

Orchestral

Symphonies 
 Symphony No. 1 in C Minor (premièred before 4 March 1847)
 Symphony No. 2 in E Minor (premièred before 4 March 1847)
 Symphony No. 3 in C Major "Military" (premièred 21 April 1850)
 Symphony No. 4 in b Minor (premièred 16 March 1851)
 Symphony No. 5 in f minor (premièred 1 May 1852) [earlier list contradicted the Worldcat source given in note #2: it is clearly in f-minor.] [This is an error that has been perpetuated by the Furore verlag edition, 2005, and by the recording on Dreyer-Gaido. The F minor symphony is, in fact, No. 7. The Symphony No. 5 is in D major and the score is presumed lost. See: https://www.unsungcomposers.com/forum/index.php/topic,3920.0.html]
 Symphony No. 6 in E Major (premièred 25 April 1853)
 Symphony No. 7 in f Minor (1855–56; premièred in April 1862) 
 Symphony No. 8 in F Major (1856–57; premièred in March 1862) – presumed lost

Piano and orchestral 
 Piano Concerto in B flat Major (1850)

Overtures 
 Overture (No. 1) in C Minor (early work)
 Overture No. 2 in D Major (premièred 21 April 1850)
 Overture No. 3 in C Major (premièred 21 April 1850)
 Overture (No. 4) in D Minor (premièred 21 April 1850)
 Ouverture serieuse (No. 5) (premièred 15 January 1879) – presumed lost
 Overture to Faust (No. 6), Op. 46 (1880; premièred in March 1881)
 Ouvertura giocosa (No. 7) (premièred in April 1883) – presumed lost

Opera 
 Die Fischerin

Lieder 
 Du bist wie eine Blume, Op. 7/1
 O lass mich dein gedenken, Op. 7/2
 Wenn der Abendstern die Rosen, Op. 7/3
 Erlkönig (version 1)
 Erlkönig (version 2)
 2 Gesänge
 2 Kinderlieder

References

External links 
 List of compositions (in German)

Mayer, Emilie